Floris Frederik van Son (born February 5, 1992) is a Canadian field hockey player who plays as a forward for Dutch Hoofdklasse club Hurley and the Canadian national team. Although born in the Netherlands, Van Son represents the country of birth of his father, Canada.

Career 
Van Son represented Canada at the 2017 Men's Pan American Cup, winning silver. In 2018, Van Son competed for Canada at the 2018 Commonwealth Games in the Gold Coast, Australia. The team finished in 8th. Later that year, Van Son was part of the 11th place Canadian team at the 2018 Men's Field hockey World Cup.

Olympics
Van Son was selected to represent Canada at the 2020 Summer Olympics.

References

External links
 
 
 
 
 

1992 births
Living people
Canadian male field hockey players
Male field hockey forwards
Commonwealth Games competitors for Canada
Field hockey players at the 2018 Commonwealth Games
2018 Men's Hockey World Cup players
Canadian people of Dutch descent
Sportspeople from Apeldoorn
Field hockey players at the 2020 Summer Olympics
Olympic field hockey players of Canada
Men's Hoofdklasse Hockey players
20th-century Canadian people
21st-century Canadian people